WeiLeun Fang from the National Tsing Hua University, Hsinchu, Taiwan, was named Fellow of the Institute of Electrical and Electronics Engineers (IEEE) in 2015 for contributions to measurement methods and process technologies for micro-electromechanical systems.

References

Fellow Members of the IEEE
Living people
Year of birth missing (living people)
Place of birth missing (living people)
Academic staff of the National Tsing Hua University